In the Newman–Penrose (NP) formalism of general relativity, Weyl scalars refer to a set of five complex scalars   which encode the ten independent components of the Weyl tensor of a four-dimensional spacetime.

Definitions
Given a complex null tetrad  and with the convention , the Weyl-NP scalars are defined by

Note: If one adopts the convention , the definitions of  should take the opposite values; that is to say,  after the signature transition.

Alternative derivations

According to the definitions above, one should find out the Weyl tensors before calculating the Weyl-NP scalars via contractions with relevant tetrad vectors. This method, however, does not fully reflect the spirit of Newman–Penrose formalism. As an alternative, one could firstly compute the spin coefficients and then use the NP field equations to derive the five Weyl-NP scalars

where  (used for ) refers to the NP curvature scalar   which could be calculated directly from the spacetime metric .

Physical interpretation

Szekeres (1965) gave an interpretation of the different Weyl scalars at large distances:

 is a "Coulomb" term, representing the gravitational monopole of the source;
 &  are ingoing and outgoing "longitudinal" radiation terms;
 &  are ingoing and outgoing "transverse" radiation terms.

For a general asymptotically flat spacetime containing radiation (Petrov Type I),  &  can be transformed to zero by an appropriate choice of null tetrad. Thus these can be viewed as gauge quantities.

A particularly important case is the Weyl scalar .
It can be shown to describe outgoing gravitational radiation (in an asymptotically flat spacetime) as

There are, however, certain examples in which the interpretation listed above fails. These are exact vacuum solutions of the Einstein field equations with cylindrical symmetry. Furthermore, purely outgoing Einstein-Rosen waves have a non-zero "incoming transverse wave"-component .

See also 
Weyl-NP and Ricci-NP scalars

References

General relativity